James Warden was a Scottish footballer who played as a defender for Dumbarton, Third Lanark, Dunfermline Athletic and Alloa Athletic during the 1920s and 1930s.

While at Third Lanark, he was selected once for the Scottish Football League XI in September 1933. The SFL lost 3–0 to the Irish League XI in Belfast, and of the 11 picked by the Scots (seven of whom were making their debuts), only one was selected again.

References 

Scottish footballers
Dumbarton F.C. players
Dunfermline Athletic F.C. players
Renfrew F.C. players
Alloa Athletic F.C. players
Scottish Junior Football Association players
Scottish Football League players
Scottish Football League representative players
Third Lanark A.C. players
Raith Rovers F.C. players
Year of birth missing
Year of death missing
Association football defenders